The 1978–79 Montenegrin Republic League was the 34th season of Montenegrin Republic League. The season started in August 1978 and finished in May 1979.

Season 

In Montenegrin Republic League 1978-79 participated 14 teams. Among the clubs which didn't play on previous season were Lovćen (relegated from Yugoslav Second League) and three best teams from lower tier - Igalo, Ulcinj and Rudar.The title won OFK Titograd, with five points more than Iskra

Table

Higher leagues 
On season 1978–79, three Montenegrin teams played in higher leagues of SFR Yugoslavia. Budućnost participated in 1978–79 Yugoslav First League, while two other teams (Sutjeska and Jedinstvo) participated in 1978–79 Yugoslav Second League.

See also 
 Montenegrin Republic League
Montenegrin Republic Cup (1947–2006)
Montenegrin clubs in Yugoslav football competitions (1946–2006)
Montenegrin Football Championship (1922–1940)

References 

Montenegrin Republic League
1978–79 in Yugoslav football
1978–79 in European third tier association football leagues